Simone Thiero (born 15 March 1993) is a French-Congolese handball player. She plays for the club TV Nellingen and is member of the DR Congo national team. She competed at the 2015 World Women's Handball Championship in Denmark.

References

External links

1993 births
Living people
Democratic Republic of the Congo female  handball players
Expatriate handball players
Democratic Republic of the Congo expatriates in France